Carry Me is the third studio album by Christian singer-songwriter Josh Wilson, which was produced by Matt Bronleewe and released on April 9, 2013, by Sparrow Records. The album achieved commercial successes and critical acclamation.

Theme
Josh Wilson gave an interview to Christian Music Zine's Joshua Andre and was asked "For me, Carry Me is your best album yet, what are the main themes of the album? Can you tell us about the story behind the lead single “Carry Me” and what the song means to you? What are your other favourite songs on the album?"

Instrumentation
In the same interview with Christian Music Zine's Joshua Andre, Josh Wilson was asked the question "As a singer-songwriter that has previously played almost every instrument on studio albums, and every instrument during live shows through live looping; what are the challenges of creating a follow up album to the successful and respected See You?"

Critical reception

Carry Me has achieved critical acclaim from the ten music critics. AllMusic's David Jeffries noted how the release "finds new inspiration in slice-of-life, strum-along songs", and those are "showcasing" the artists' "newfound love of effectively blending the acoustic with the electronic." At CCM Magazine, Grace S. Aspinwall told that "in his upbeat style, Josh Wilson presents his most versatile work to date." Joshua Andre of Christian Music Zine called Carry Me "punchy and emotional music", which contains "12 gems and treasures", and that "is a 45 minutes testimony of God’s goodness!" Andre finished with noting that "everything about Josh Wilson's Carry Me is magical, from the courageous diversity in instruments and multiple musical genres, to the heartfelt and personal lyrics." Cross Rhythms' Stephen Curry alluded to how the album is "his most personal to date", and called it "a finely crafted set of songs." At Indie Vision Music, Jonathan Andre exclaimed that the songs on the album "speak deeply to the soul", which he called the release "truly powerful in its imagery and poetic nature, Josh presents to us a plethora of musical genres and themes", and affirmed that the project is "a musical reminder of God carrying us through the storms of our lives as we let go of everything that holds us back." Jesus Freak Hideout's Bert Gangl found that "to be equitable, the back end of the album, as a whole, is less consistently impressive than its first portion, thanks in part to the less vivacious, slightly more generic nature of its contents." Additionally, Gangl found "Wilson's refreshingly forthright lyrics and ability to find light in even the darkest of themes combine to offer a modicum of relief from this latter-segment deficit." Gangl concluded with writing that "Carry Me doesn't quite qualify as groundbreaking or fillerless, it is still an engaging, thought-provoking, and ultimately uplifting collection of songs that should, if there's any justice in the world, go great lengths toward earning its talented creator an evening's worth of peaceful, uninterrupted sleep." Louder Than the Music's Jono Davies alluded to how this release "moved away a bit too much from the acoustic mid-rock genre into a slightly more poppier, catchy chorus kind of album." Kevin Davis of New Release Tuesday evoked how "Carry Me paints a refreshingly relevant musical palate that frames its message beautifully", and noted that the album "is sure to connect with all listeners who like catchy songs filled with truth and yearning for God." In addition, Davis found that Wilson "invites you into his life in such an authentic and relatable way, you’ll feel like you are a lifelong friend after you hear this album." At Worship Leader, Jay Akins vowed that "this record is a new level of Great", which he told that "these songs are so rich with truth and full of life and God's grace," and called this "one of the best and well-rounded records" Ken Wiegman of Alpha Omega News noted how the release "has so much depth to it and it is sure to bring comfort to many."

Commercial performance
For the Billboard charting week of April 27, 2013, Carry Me was the No. 129 most sold album in the entirety of the United States via the Billboard 200 placement, and it was the fifth most sold album in the Christian market segment by the Christian Albums charting.

Track listing

Personnel 
 Josh Wilson – lead vocals, backing vocals, keyboards, guitars 
 Matt Bronleewe – keyboards, guitars 
 Fred Williams – programming 
 Andrew Osenga – electric guitars
 Tony Lucido – bass 
 Jeremy Lutito – drums 
 Sam Levine – saxophones, woodwinds
 Chris Carmichael – strings, string arrangements 
 Wes Pickering – backing vocals 
 Becca Wilson – backing vocals

Production 
 Matt Bronleewe – producer 
 Brad O'Donnell – A&R 
 Shane D. Wilson – recording, mixing 
 Neal Avron – mixing 
 John Denosky – editing 
 Tom Coyne – mastering at Sterling Sound (New York, NY)
 Lani Crump – production coordinator 
 Dave Steunebrink – production coordinator 
 Jan Cook – art direction 
 Sarah Sung – design, packaging 
 Lee Steffen – photography

Charts
Album

Singles

References

2013 albums
Josh Wilson (musician) albums
Albums produced by Matt Bronleewe
Sparrow Records albums